Thiothinone (βk-MPA) is a stimulant that is the beta-keto substituted analog of methiopropamine and has been sold online as a designer drug. It is structurally related to methcathinone however the phenyl group has been substituted for thiophene instead.

Thiothinone was also reported to be a pyrolysis product of methiopropamine.

See also 
 5-Cl-bk-MPA
 α-Pyrrolidinopentiothiophenone (α-PVT)
 Methcathinone
 Methiopropamine, non-ketone counterpart

References 

Cathinones
Thiophenes
Designer drugs
Norepinephrine–dopamine reuptake inhibitors
Stimulants